Rrezart Cungu (born 18 July 1998) is a Montenegrin tennis player.

Cungu has a career high ATP singles ranking of 614 achieved on 19 December 2022. He also has a career high ATP doubles ranking of 973, achieved on 8 January 2018. Cungu has won 1 ITF doubles title.
 
Cungu has represented Montenegro at Davis Cup, his debut was one day before his 17th birthday against Estonia on 17 July 2017. In Davis Cup he has a win–loss record of 17–13. He also plays on the Wake Forest University tennis team, with whom he won the ACC Championship and NCAA Division I Men's Tennis Team Championship in 2018.

Future and Challenger finals

Singles: 4 (2–2)

Doubles 2 (1–1)

Davis Cup

Participations: (17–13)

   indicates the outcome of the Davis Cup match followed by the score, date, place of event, the zonal classification and its phase, and the court surface.

Games of the Small States of Europe

Mixed Doubles 1 (1 runner-up)

See also
List of Montenegro Davis Cup team representatives

References

External links 
 
 
 

1998 births
Living people
Montenegrin male tennis players
Wake Forest Demon Deacons men's tennis players
People from Ulcinj